Noraville is a suburb of the Central Coast region of New South Wales, Australia. It is part of the  local government area. It is the site of Edward Hargraves' property that he purchased after his discovery of payable gold.

As part of the Toukley district, Noraville has a similar elderly demographic. to that of Toukley.

Heritage listings
Noraville has a number of heritage-listed sites, including:
 3 Elizabeth Drive: Hargraves House, Noraville

References

 
Suburbs of the Central Coast (New South Wales)